Estwing Manufacturing Company is an American manufacturer of hammers, axes, and other tools, founded by Swedish immigrant Ernest O. Estwing in 1923. The company is headquartered in Rockford, Illinois.

History and products 

Estwing Manufacturing Company was founded in Rockford, Illinois in 1923 by Ernest O. Estwing. Estwing was an immigrant from Sweden who settled in Rockford with many other Swedish immigrants.

Estwing manufactures striking tools such as hammers, axes, pry bars, bricklayer's tools, roofer's tools, geologist's hammers, and various specialty striking tools. Estwing products are constructed of a single piece of hardened tool steel.

Estwing Awards 

Estwing offers prizes to students at various colleges throughout the country, such as the Estwing Award for most outstanding graduate student at Cornell University, the Estwing Outstanding Senior Geologist Award at Colorado College, and the Estwing Hammer Prize to an outstanding geology graduate student at Yale Graduate School of Arts and Sciences.

Gallery

References 
!. Estwing tour

External links 
Estwing Official Website

Striking tool manufacturers
United States
Manufacturing companies based in Illinois
Manufacturing companies of the United States
Goods manufactured in the United States
Companies based in Rockford, Illinois